Mario David may refer to:
 Mario David (footballer)
 Mario David (director)
 Mario David (actor)